Northern Knights was formed in 2013 and became a first-class team in 2017. They played their inaugural first-class match in the 2017 Inter-Provincial Championship against North West Warriors. Northern Knights are yet to win the Interprovincial Championship, in either it time as a non first-class competition, or with first-class status. In total, 29 players have appeared in first-class cricket for Northern Knights, with James McCollum having played in all 11 first-class fixtures played by Northern Knights.

McCollum is Northern Knights leading run-scorer in first-class cricket, aggregating 750 runs. Three batsmen have scored a century for Northern Knights in the format: McCollum, James Shannon and Harry Tector. Tector's score of 146, is the highest score by a Northern Knights batsman, while Shannon has the teams best batting average: 61.33. Among the bowlers, South African-born James Cameron-Dow has taken more wickets than any other, claiming 15. McCollum has the best bowling figures in an innings: he claimed five wickets against North West Warriors in a 2018 match, while conceding 32 runs.

Players are initially listed in order of appearance; where players made their debut in the same match, they are initially listed by batting order.

Key

List of first-class cricketers

See also
List of Northern Knights List A players
List of Northern Knights Twenty20 players
List of Irish first-class cricketers

References

Northern Knights (cricket team)
Cricketers, first class